Chinook Winds Casino and convention center is a Native American casino located in Lincoln City, Oregon.  It is operated by the Confederated Tribes of Siletz. The casino's amenities include a 227-room hotel, a  gaming floor (between two floors), two restaurants (with a 24-hour food counter), a  convention center, arcade, day-care services, live entertainment, a golf course and other special events.  

The casino typically operates 24 hours a day, 365 days a year. It opened to the public at limited capacity on January 15, 2021, after closing for the COVID-19 pandemic.

See also
Gambling in Oregon
List of casinos in Oregon

References

External links 
 Chinook Winds Official site
 Confederated Tribes of Siletz Official site

Casinos in Oregon
Casino hotels
Native American casinos
Lincoln City, Oregon
Sports venues in Oregon
Music venues in Oregon
Buildings and structures in Lincoln County, Oregon
Tourist attractions in Lincoln County, Oregon
Casinos completed in 1995
Hotel buildings completed in 1995
1995 establishments in Oregon
Native American history of Oregon